Diadegma coleophorarum is a wasp first described by Julius Theodor Christian Ratzeburg in 1852.
No subspecies are listed.

References

coleophorarum
Taxa named by Julius Theodor Christian Ratzeburg
Insects described in 1852
Hymenoptera of Europe